Badava Gopi is an Indian stand-up comedian and actor.

Career
Badava Gopi is an Indian stand-up comedian, actor, singer, hailing from Chennai, Tamil Nadu. He was introduced into films in 2005 in the movie Poi, shot in Sri Lanka by the veteran director Thiru K. Balachander (who is the guru to Kamal Haasan, Rajinikanth and many others in the film industry), he has performed his comedy shows globally and the show performed exclusively for Dr. Apj Abdul Kalam has earned him many accolades. He was a radio jockey and host, with Hello FM and Radio city. Gopi has worked as an actor, often portraying supporting comedic characters. He has often been cast in films directed by Venkat Prabhu, while he has also portrayed major roles in Samuthirakani's Poraali & Nimirndhu Nil. Gopi portrayed a television journalist in Thodari (2016), and to prepare for his role, he observed several television hosts and incorporated their body language into his performance.

Gopi has also worked as a cricket commentator, initially working on Celebrity Cricket League matches, before working for professional players in the Tamil Nadu Premier League. Gopi acted as a cricket commentator in the film Chennai 28, again he acted in its sequel.

Filmography

As an actor

Webseries

As singer

In television

References
SONYLIV WEB SERIES MEME BOYS 
https://timesofindia.indiatimes.com/videos/entertainment/web-series/mx-play/tamil/meme-boys-trailer-guru-somasundaram-and-badava-gopi-starrer-meme-boys-official-trailer/videoshow/93052112.cms

External links

 www.badavagopi.com
 Badava Gopi on Moviebuff

Indian male film actors
Living people
Tamil male actors
Male actors in Tamil cinema
Male actors from Madurai
Tamil comedians
Tamil television presenters
Indian male comedians
21st-century Indian male actors
1973 births